The Unknown Soldier Statue' is a war memorial in Tirana for the soldiers that fell in the struggle against the Italian invaders during Second World War. It's located near the Albanian parliament and the Tomb of Kapllan Pasha. It was placed by the Albanian communists: For its construction, the 350-year old Sulejman Pasha Mosque built by the founder of the capital Sulejman Bargjini had been destroyed. The sculpture features a soldier with a raised fist and rifle, struggling forward.

References

Outdoor sculptures in Tirana
Tombs of Unknown Soldiers
Monuments and memorials in Albania